Lélé is a town in southern Cameroon, near the junction of the borders of Cameroon, Gabon and Congo-Brazzaville.

Statistics 

 Population = 794

See also 

 Lélé River

References

External links 

Populated places in South Region (Cameroon)